N-(3'-Fluoropropyl-)-3β-(4'-chlorophenyl)-2β-(3'-phenylisoxazol-5'-yl)nortropane (FP-β-CPPIT) is a cocaine analogue.

See also
 List of cocaine analogues

References

Tropanes
Dopamine reuptake inhibitors
Stimulants
Chloroarenes
Organofluorides
Isoxazoles